("The die is cast") is a variation of a Latin phrase attributed by Suetonius to Julius Caesar on 10 January 49 BC, as he led his army across the Rubicon river in Northern Italy. With this step, he entered Italy at the head of his army in defiance of the Senate and began his long civil war against Pompey and the Optimates. The phrase, either in the original Latin or in translation, is used in many languages to indicate that events have passed a point of no return. It is now most commonly cited with the word order changed ("Alea iacta est") rather than in the original phrasing. The same event inspired another idiom with the same meaning, "crossing the Rubicon".

Meaning and forms

Caesar was said to have borrowed the phrase from Menander, the famous Greek writer of comedy, whom he appreciated more than the Roman playwright Terence. Plutarch reports that these words were said in Greek:

Suetonius, a contemporary of Plutarch writing in Latin, reports a similar phrase.

Lewis and Short, citing Casaubon and Ruhnk, suggest that the text of Suetonius should read  (reading the third-person singular future imperative  instead of the present one ), which they translate as "Let the die be cast!", or "Let the game be ventured!". This matches Plutarch's use of third-person singular perfect middle/passive imperative of the verb , i.e. .

In Latin  refers to a game with dice and, more generally, a game of hazard or chance. Dice were common in Roman times and were usually cast three at a time. There were two kinds.

See also

 Aleatoricism
 List of Latin phrases
 Ut est rerum omnium magister usus

References

External links

 Divus Iulius, paragraph 32 by Suetonius, where the quote is found.
 Reference to Augustus playing Alea

Quotes by Julius Caesar
Quotations from military
Latin quotations